Equiangular may refer to:
Equiangular lines, a set of lines where every pair of lines makes the same angle
Equiangular polygon, a polygon with equal angles
Logarithmic spiral or equiangular spiral, a type of geometric spiral
Unicode symbol  represents the equiangular relation

sv:Likvinklig